Mánya is the Hungarian name for two villages, one in Romania and one in Slovakia:

 Maia village, Bobâlna Commune, Cluj County, Romania
 Maňa village, Nové Zámky District, Nitra Region, Slovakia